Frank van Eijs (born 2 November 1971 in Stein, Limburg) is a Dutch retired footballer, who works as a player agent in Asia.

Club career
Van Eijs has played for several teams in Europe, including spells in Belgium, Scotland, Germany and his native Netherlands, as well as China. He played for TOP Oss in the Eerste Divisie and Dundee F.C. in the Scottish Premier League. In 2005 he moved to New Zealand to play for New Zealand Knights.

Player agency
Van Eijs was the player agent who brought Danny van Bakel to Vietnam and Wiljan Pluim to Indonesia.

References

External links
 Frank van Eijs Interview

1971 births
Living people
People from Stein, Limburg
Association football defenders
Dutch footballers
K.V. Mechelen players
Van Eijs, Frank
Rot-Weiss Essen players
TOP Oss players
SV Meppen players
Van Eijs, Frank
Van Eijs, Frank
Van Eijs, Frank
Eerste Divisie players
Van Eijs, Frank
Dutch expatriate footballers
Expatriate footballers in Belgium
Van Eijs, Frank
Expatriate footballers in Germany
Expatriate footballers in China
Expatriate footballers in Vietnam
Van Eijs, Frank
Dutch expatriate sportspeople in Belgium
Van Eijs, Frank
Dutch expatriate sportspeople in Germany
Dutch expatriate sportspeople in China
Dutch expatriate sportspeople in Vietnam
Van Eijs, Frank
Dutch sports agents
Association football agents
Footballers from Limburg (Netherlands)